Hymns of the Church of Jesus Christ of Latter-day Saints is the official hymnal of the Church of Jesus Christ of Latter-day Saints (LDS Church).
Published in English in 1985, and later in many other languages, it is used throughout the LDS Church. This article refers to the English version. The book was published on the 150th anniversary of the publication of the first LDS hymnbook, compiled by Emma Smith in 1835. Previous hymnbooks used by the church include The Manchester Hymnal (1840), The Psalmody (1889), Songs of Zion (1908), Hymns (1927), and Hymns (1948).

On June 18, 2018, the church announced that updated versions of the hymnbook and the Children's Songbook would be created, by soliciting feedback for a one-year period concluding in July 2019, culminating in unified versions of the books in languages used by congregations worldwide, having the same numbering system.

Organization

The book contains a table of contents, followed by a preface with a message from the church's first presidency, which encourages church members to use the hymn book at meetings and in their homes to invite the spirit and to teach doctrine.

The hymn section is divided into thematic groups:

Following the hymns, a section titled "Using the Hymnbook" gives helpful information for choristers and accompanists.

Finally, the hymns are listed in multiple indexes according to the authors' and composers' names, hymn titles, tune names, meters, scriptures referenced, etc.

Numbering
Members of the church sometimes debate about whether to say "hymn number" or "page number" when referring to the location of a particular hymn. The hymn numbers are not 1:1 with the number of pages. The hymns themselves are numbered and not the pages.

Format
Most of the hymns are arranged in traditional SATB format with treble and bass clefs. The suggested tempo range (in beats per minute) is given, along with an indication of the appropriate mood for the song such as "joyfully," "reflectively," "with vigor," etc. Beneath the hymn are listed the author and composer and their years of birth and death (if applicable), copyright information, and scriptural references.

The book is laid out so that hymns occupying two pages in the book always start on the left. Thus, a page turn is never required in the middle of a hymn.

A few of the hymns have the same text, and even the same title, but are set to different hymn tunes.

Recordings
The church has released recordings of the hymns in CD sets. One set is instrumental only, and is sometimes used as accompaniment in church meetings. In the other set, the hymns are sung by a quartet with piano or organ accompaniment.

Many popular singers and instrumentalists, including the Tabernacle Choir at Temple Square, Orchestra at Temple Square and Saints Unified Voices have also recorded arrangements of LDS hymns.

Languages
Many of the hymns have been translated and published in editions designed for use in other countries. Some of these editions include hymns not found in the English version, such as traditional Christmas carols and patriotic music of the countries where they are used.

The hymn book has been published in several languages, including:

Albanian
Bulgarian
Cambodian
Chinese
Danish
Dutch
Fijian
Finnish
French
German
Hungarian
Icelandic
Indonesian
Italian
Japanese
Kekchi
Korean
Latvian
Lithuanian
Norwegian
Portuguese
Romanian
Russian
Samoan
Spanish
Swedish
Tagalog
Tahitian
Thai
Tongan
Ukrainian

See also
Hymns of the Saints, the Community of Christ (former RLDS) hymnal.
Hymns in the Church of Jesus Christ of Latter-day Saints
Latter Day Saint poetry
List of English-language hymnals by denomination

References

External links
 Hymns at churchofjesuschrist.org (includes index, text, music, and free audio downloads for most hymns in 1985 book; some excluded for copyright reasons)

1985 books
Latter Day Saint hymnals
The Church of Jesus Christ of Latter-day Saints texts
1985 in Christianity
1985 in music